Speicherville is an unincorporated community in Lagro Township, Wabash County, in the U.S. state of Indiana.

It is located on Indiana State Road 13 between Wabash and Urbana.

History
Speicherville was platted in 1881 by Christian W. Speicher, and named for him. An old variant name of the community was called Spiker.

A post office was established under the name Spiker in 1881, and remained in operation until it was discontinued in 1913.

Geography

References

Unincorporated communities in Wabash County, Indiana
Unincorporated communities in Indiana